The Nob Hill neighborhood of Guantanamo Bay Naval Base of the United States Navy in Guantánamo Bay, Cuba, is located at the northeast end of Sherman Avenue.

Overview
Rebuilt in 1997, there are 33 flat and 2-story duplex housing units.

This neighborhood is reserved for the senior enlisted ranks (E-7 to E-9), company-grade officers, and civilian GS equivalent.

External links
 Navy Housing Web Page for Nob Hill Area 

Guantanamo Bay Naval Base